Tenda may refer to:

 Tende, a town in southeastern France and formerly part of Italy
 Tenda, a character and tribe in the video game EarthBound
 Construtora Tenda
 Tendaguru Formation, fossil-rich formations in Tanzania
 Tenda, ethnic group of Guinea-Bissau
 Tenda, is a village in vaishali district of bihar in India
 Tenta, a neolithic settlement in Cyprus
 Shenzhen Tenda Technology Co., Ltd., a manufacturer of networking hardware peripherals.

See also

 
 
 Tend (disambiguation)